Gábor Juhász (born 14 July 1963) is a Hungarian politician, who served as Minister of Civilian Intelligence Services of Hungary between 2009 and 2010.

References
 Biográf ki kicsoda (Budapest, 2003)
 Hivatalos életrajza az MSZP honlapján

1963 births
Living people
People from Salgótarján
Secret ministers of Hungary
Hungarian Socialist Party politicians
Members of the National Assembly of Hungary (1994–1998)
Members of the National Assembly of Hungary (1998–2002)
Members of the National Assembly of Hungary (2002–2006)
Members of the National Assembly of Hungary (2006–2010)